Flynn Creek is a stream in Custer County, South Dakota.

Flynn Creek is named for Ed Flynn, a pioneer settler.

See also
List of rivers of South Dakota

References

Rivers of Custer County, South Dakota
Rivers of South Dakota